Hobo Rocket is the fifth studio album by Australian rock band Pond. It was released in August 2013 under Modular Recordings.

Track listing

Charts

References

2013 albums
Modular Recordings albums
Pond (Australian band) albums
Albums produced by Kevin Parker